Maude Allen (November 30, 1887 – April 24, 1960) was an American character actress.  She was born in Middleborough, Massachusetts.  Died in Los Angeles, California, aged 72.

She appeared in several Hollywood films in the 1930s and 1940s, including small roles in Show Boat (1936), San Francisco (1936), and as "Dutchess" in the serial The Adventures of Red Ryder (1940).

Partial filmography
 Black Diamonds (1940)
 Danger Ahead (1940)

External links

1887 births
1960 deaths
American film actresses
20th-century American actresses